Nicolae Dașcovici (born February 13, 1888, Calafat – d. February 22, 1969, Bucharest) was a jurist, politician, historian, university professor, Romanian diplomat and Romanian publicist, corresponding member (from 1948) of the Romanian Academy.

Dașcovici was a member of several Romanian and international scientific societies: Romanian Social Institute, Romanian Naval League, The Econometric Society (Colorado Springs), Royal Economic Society (London), Permanent Office of International Legal Documentation (The Hague). Corresponding member of the Romanian Academy (June 1, 1948). Decorated with the Romanian Star with swords and the War Cross with the "Mărășești" bar.

References

1888 births
1969 deaths
People from Calafat
20th-century Romanian historians
Romanian jurists
Romanian opinion journalists
Corresponding members of the Romanian Academy
University of Bucharest alumni
Academic staff of Alexandru Ioan Cuza University